The following article presents a summary of the 1965 football (soccer) season in Brazil, which was the 64th season of competitive football in the country.

Taça Brasil

Semifinals

|}

Final

Santos declared as the Taça Brasil champions by aggregate score of 6–1.

Torneio Rio-São Paulo

Final Standings

Palmeiras won both stages of the competition, thus no final was played, and the club was declared as Torneio Rio-São Paulo champions.

State championship champions

Brazilian clubs in international competitions

Brazil national team
The following table lists all the games played by the Brazil national football team in official competitions and friendly matches during 1965.

References

 Brazilian competitions at RSSSF
 1965 Brazil national team matches at RSSSF

 
Seasons in Brazilian football
Brazil